Shebli (also Romanized as Sheblī; also known as Gardaneh-ye Sheblī and Shibli) is a village in Shebli Rural District, in the Central District of Bostanabad County, East Azerbaijan Province, Iran. At the 2006 census, its population was 160, in 20 families.

References 

Populated places in Bostanabad County